Trial Farm is a village near Orange Walk Town in the Orange Walk District of the nation of Belize.  According to the 2000 census, it had a population of 3,443 people. It is located at 29 metres above sea level.

Trial Farm is a very vivid and warm village. Villagers are kind and always willing to lend a hand.

Operation New Horizons 2007 commanded by the Louisiana Army National Guard built two additional rooms on to the school at Trial Farm between 17 March - 12 May 2007.

Populated places in Orange Walk District